Arpe is a river of North Rhine-Westphalia, Germany, in the west of the Hochsauerlandkreis. It is a left tributary of the Wenne which it joins at Berge, a district of Meschede. It should not be confused with the Arpe, also a left tributary of the Wenne in the Hochsauerlandkreis, but joining at Niederberndorf, a district of Schmallenberg.

See also
List of rivers of North Rhine-Westphalia

Rivers of North Rhine-Westphalia
Rivers of Germany